Igor Zhiltsov (Игорь Жильцов), (born circa 1966) is a Russian rugby league footballer who represented Russia in the 2000 World Cup.

Career
Known for his performances for Lokomotiv, champion and winner of the Russian Cup . He played for the team since the days of the USSR . As a member of the  Russia, he played at the 2000 World Cup, He played in two matches at the tournament, coming off the bench in both games. He also made a try against Fiji in the tournament .

References

Living people
Russian rugby league players
Russia national rugby league team players
1966 births
Place of birth missing (living people)